A-Kon is an annual three-day anime convention held during June at the Irving Convention Center at Las Colinas and Toyota Music Factory in Irving, Texas. First held in 1990 with just 380 people in attendance, A-Kon is North America's longest running convention primarily focused on anime.

Departments
A-Kon consists of many volunteer managed teams each dedicated to operating a portion of this large convention. Each year, usually in February or March, they post a web page for volunteer sign-up. Volunteers work at least sixteen hours during the weekend and receive a free pass to the convention. Working for 20 hours, volunteers aged over 18 can receive a hotel room, shared with 3 other staff members.

Programming
While the focus of the convention was originally centered on anime fandom and screenings of films and television series, many other activities take place encompassing various segments of geek and Japanese pop culture. These events include panels with American authors and artists, a console gaming room, tabletop gaming room,  cosplay, scavenger hunts, martial arts demonstrations, an art show, and concerts by Japanese and SteamPunk bands.  The convention also maintains a vigorous social network presence on Facebook and Twitter, having about 15,000 and 7,000 followers respectively, through which they post information and run contests throughout the year.

History
The name seems to be a play on the early anime series Project A-ko. A-Kon 2020 was cancelled due to the COVID-19 pandemic. A-Kon 2021 was also cancelled due to the COVID-19 pandemic.

Event history

References

External links
 Project: A-Kon web site

Anime conventions in the United States
Recurring events established in 1990
1990 establishments in Texas
Annual events in Texas
Conventions in Texas
Festivals in Texas
Japanese-American culture in Texas
Tourist attractions in Texas